Greenheart Group is a listed multi-national forestry company based in Hong Kong.

The company owns 13,000 hectares of softwood plantation forest in New Zealand and 322,000 hectares of concessions and harvesting rights in Suriname. Greenheart sells softwood logs to China, India, South Korea and also domestically in New Zealand.  The company also sells hardwood lumber, and various wood products to China and European countries.

New Zealand Radiata Pine Plantation
Greenheart Group operates a softwood plantation forest business in New Zealand with radiata pine as main its main commercial species.  The company exports its radiata pine logs to countries such as China, India, Korea and Japan.

Suriname Natural Forest Concession
Greenheart Group operates a hardwood business in Suriname.  The company practices sustainable forest harvesting and has two large scale sawmills to produce lumber for sales to Europe and Asia. The company is also building a bioenergy plant to convert timber waste into clean energy.

Company Development
2010 - Official branding and establishment
2011 - Acquisition of a 13,000 hectare New Zealand plantation forest
2012 - Commissioning of new sawmill and signed agreement to construct bioenergy plant in Suriname

Sustainable Forest Management
Greenheart Group currently has  Forest Stewardship Council (FSC®) controlled wood status in West Suriname forest concession and full Forest Stewardship Council (FSC®) certification for its Central Suriname forest concession.  The company practices sustainable forest management and silviculture systems to ensure a systematic pruning which allows a faster natural regeneration of trees.

Annual financial information (2010-2012)
Greenheart's annual revenue has increased 29 times since formal branding and establishment in 2010.

References

External links
Official Website

Forest products companies of Hong Kong
Renewable resource companies established in 2010
2010 establishments in Hong Kong
Chinese companies established in 2010